Eacles magnifica is a moth of the  family Saturniidae. It is found in Mexico, Guatemala, Nicaragua, Panama, Brazil, Argentina, and Paraguay.

Subspecies
Eacles magnifica magnifica
Eacles magnifica opaca (Paraguay, Bolivia, Brazil, Uruguay, Argentina)

External links
 Species info

Ceratocampinae
Moths described in 1855